The  2010 UNAF U-20 Tournament was an invitational association football tournament that took place in Algeria during March and April 2010. The tournament was organised by UNAF. All games took place in Algiers.

The participants were:

Results

Final table

Awards
 Golden ball:  Ayman Trabelsi
 Golden boot:  Amara Malle
 Golden glove:  Yassine Bounou
 Fair play trophy:

External links
 Official website

References

2010 in African football
U20
UNAF U-20 Tournament
UNAF U-20 Tournament